Events in the year 2023 in Albania.

Incumbents 

 President: Bajram Begaj
 Prime Minister: Edi Rama
 Deputy Prime Minister: Belinda Balluku

Events

January 

 1 January – Albtelecom and One Telecommunications finalise merger to become ONE Albania.

Scheduled events 
 14 May – 2023 Albanian local elections

Sports 

 2022–23 Albanian Cup
 24 September – 7 May 2023: 2022–23 Albanian Women's National Championship

References 

 
2020s in Albania
Years of the 21st century in Albania
Albania
Albania